opened in Iwaki, Fukushima Prefecture, Japan in 1997. It exhibits artefacts from local excavations, including items from the painted .

See also
 Fukushima Museum
 List of Historic Sites of Japan (Fukushima)
 Shiramizu Amidadō

References

External links
  Iwaki City Archaeological Museum

Museums in Fukushima Prefecture
Iwaki, Fukushima
Archaeological museums in Japan
Museums established in 1997
1997 establishments in Japan